Twin Mirror is a narrative adventure game developed and published by Dontnod Entertainment and co-produced by Shibuya Productions. It was released on 1 December 2020 for Microsoft Windows, PlayStation 4, and Xbox One.

Gameplay

Twin Mirror is an adventure game played from a third-person view. Players control the investigative journalist Sam, who has returned to his hometown of Basswood, West Virginia. The environment is interactive and its objects are obtainable. Whom Sam speaks to is optional and, based on the state of his investigation, there are multiple endings to unlock. 

Players navigate between the real world and Sam's "Mind Palace" to discover clues. Sam's inner voice, the Double, may aid or harm the investigation.

Plot

Samuel "Sam" Higgs, a former investigative journalist, returns to Basswood, West Virginia in light of his close friend Nick's death. He originally left Basswood following publication of his article about safety violations at the town's coal mines. The mines closed in the aftermath, ultimately leaving hundreds without jobs and angered townsfolk who despise Sam. During his stay in the town, Nick's daughter, Joan, asks him to check on the events leading up to Nick's death as she finds his activity before he died suspicious. Sam teams up with Anna, his ex-girlfriend who knew Nick well as they worked together at the newspaper Basswood Jungle, in hope that by following leads and investigating clues may lead to finding the source of Nick's death.

Development
Partnering with publisher Bandai Namco Entertainment Europe, Dontnod Entertainment began developing Twin Mirror in 2016 with a separate team of senior developers. About forty people were working on it as of September 2018. Lead writer Matthew Ritter was influenced by adventure games like Beneath a Steel Sky and Space Quest. 

Contrary to previous titles, Dontnod desired to have Twin Mirror be void of any supernatural elements. According to art director Pierre-Etienne Travers, the game's primary concept is duality. The decision to set it in a fictional American town, based on southern West Virginia, was to broaden its appeal.

In June 2019, Dontnod announced to self-publish the game, with Bandai Namco Entertainment acting as the distributor for the console versions. As well as Shibuya Productions becoming a co-producer of the game. Bandai Namco decided to cancel the Japanese console versions of Twin Mirror shortly after Dontnod acquired the IP rights from Bandai. 

The game was originally designed as an episodic game when it was first revealed. Following the delay, the game was reworked and the episodic format was abandoned so it can be played without any interruptions.

Release
Twin Mirror was announced with a debut trailer in June 2018 during E3 2018, set to be released for Microsoft Windows, PlayStation 4, and Xbox One the following year. In August at Gamescom, it was revealed that it would be an episodic title, with Lost on Arrival as the first of three. The game was delayed to 2020 in June 2019. The Microsoft Windows version was exclusive to the Epic Games Store for one year, on which it was released on 1 December 2020.

Reception

Twin Mirror received "mixed or average" reviews, according to Metacritic. Some reviewers criticised the game's gameplay mechanics and felt that the protagonist lacked personality. They noted it was too short. GameReactor praised the visuals.

Accolades

References

Notes

External links
 
 

Adventure games
Video games about amnesia
Bandai Namco games
Detective video games
Fiction about murder
Video games about the paranormal
PlayStation 4 games
PlayStation Network games
Science fiction video games
Single-player video games
Unreal Engine games
2020 video games
Video games developed in France
Video games set in West Virginia
Video games with alternate endings
Windows games
Xbox One games
Psychological thriller video games
Dontnod Entertainment